Kostas Sommer is a Greek actor and television host who has appeared in numerous movies and TV shows. In 2005, he appeared in the Hollywood film Deuce Bigalow: European Gigolo starring Rob Schneider, as the Greek gigolo Assapopoulos Mariolis. The role was Sommer's first Hollywood role, after his only audition since arriving in Los Angeles.

Life and career
Sommer was born in Germany, to a Greek father, from Crete, and a German mother. He uses his mother's maiden name as his stage name. Sommer spent most of his childhood years in Germany and later moved to Greece. Sommer attended the German School of Athens. He was bitten by the acting bug as a young boy, and continued working in television and film in Greece. He started modeling at age 12, and graduated of UCLA (Arts and Psychology) in 1997.

He is a very well known Greek celebrity appearing in numerous magazines and commercials as a model before participating in big screen film productions such as Brides by Pantelis Voulgaris, The Boston Strangler, A Breath's Distance, Golden Beach and Extreme Sommer. Some of his television credits include Love Came From Afar, Soko Germany.  He has also appeared in several broadway plays include playing the part of Joe Bonaparte in Golden Boy and Liliom. He enjoys extreme sports as well as skydiving, jetski, speed boat, car and motorcycle racing/stunts. Some of his other hobbies include kickboxing, sailing, scuba diving, track and field and firearms. He currently lives between Athens and Los Angeles Sommer made a guest appearance during the April 2006 Miss Star Hellas, pageant. He was starring opposite actress Fay Zafirakou,, in the Greek TV series Tis Agapis Maheria, (The Knives of Love) by Stratos Markidis for ANT1. This series had a personal connection to Kostas since the story is based in Cretan traditions.

Parallel to his acting career he was also a successful, globally very well connected businessman, entrepreneur while owning different sorts of restaurants, clubs and concierge companies etc.
After being a candidate for the European parliament in 2017, he has been involved in politics and is considered to be a top lobbyist in business and politics, with highly influential connections in both worlds. Developing Projects, and consulting parties and businesses. 
Sommer is also an active member/founder in various philanthropic and nonprofit environmental organizations such as allforblue (cleaning oceans, shores and beaches).

Filmography

References

External links
Official Site

1975 births
Greek male film actors
Greek male television actors
Living people
20th-century Greek male actors
21st-century Greek male actors
Male actors from Athens